Leech Lake is a lake in Chisago County, Minnesota, in the United States.

Leech Lake was named for the great number of leeches in its waters.

See also
List of lakes in Minnesota

References

Lakes of Minnesota
Lakes of Chisago County, Minnesota